Drimys is a genus of about eight species of woody evergreen flowering plants, in the family Winteraceae. The species are native to the Neotropics, ranging from southern Mexico to the southern tip of South America. They are primitive dicots, associated with the humid temperate Antarctic flora of the Southern Hemisphere, which evolved millions of years ago on the ancient supercontinent of Gondwana. Members of the family generally have aromatic bark and leaves, and some are used to extract essential oils.

Accepted species
Seven species are currently accepted.
Drimys andina (Reiche) R.A.Rodr. & Quez. (syn. D. winteri var. andina) - southern and central Chile and adjacent Argentina
Drimys angustifolia Miers  - southern Brazil
Drimys brasiliensis Miers  - eastern and southern Brazil, northeastern Argentina, Paraguay, and Bolivia
Drimys confertifolia Phil. - Juan Fernández Islands
Drimys granadensis L.f. - southern Mexico south to Peru
Drimys roraimensis (A.C.Sm.) Ehrend., Silberb.-Gottsb. & Gottsb. - southern Venezuela and northern Brazil, possibly western Guyana
Drimys winteri J.R.Forst. & G.Forst. - southern and central Chile, southwestern Argentina

D. confertifolia is endemic to the Juan Fernández Islands, 670 km off the Chilean coast, where it forms a dominant tree in the tall lowland forests and lower montane forests of the islands.

The genus formerly included a number of species from Australasia, including Tasmanian pepper (D. lanceolata). Recent botanical studies have led to a growing consensus of botanists to split the genus into two, with the Neotropical species remaining in genus Drimys, and the Australasian species classified in genus Tasmannia.

References

External links

Enciclopedia de la Flora Chilena: Drimys
Chilebosque: Drimys winteri
Chilebosque: Drimys andina

 
Canellales genera
Neotropical realm flora